The Rum Patrol was an operation of the United States Coast Guard to interdict liquor smuggling vessels, known as "rum runners" in order to enforce prohibition in American waters. On 18 December 1917, the 18th Amendment to the Constitution was submitted to the states by Congress. On 16 January 1919, the amendment was ratified and the Liquor Prohibition Amendment, which prohibited the manufacture, sale, transportation, importation, or exportation of intoxicating liquors, came into effect on 16 January 1920.

History

Origin
The establishment of prohibition gave rise to smuggling of illicit liquor into the United States overland from Canada and from ships moored just outside the three-mile limit along the Atlantic seaboard. By 1921, "Rum Row" existed off New York City and the New Jersey shore as well as near Boston, and the Chesapeake and Delaware bays. The Florida coast and New Orleans were also points of entry used by rum runners. Smaller boats were used to transfer the cargos from the mother ships on Rum Row under cover of darkness to the shore. In February 1922, the Commandant of the Coast Guard, Rear Admiral William E. Reynolds, informed the Assistant Secretary of the Treasury, Roy Asa Haynes that although the Coast Guard was tasked with the enforcement of prohibition, Congress had not included any funding for the additional maintenance and operation of vessels. Since there was no funding, enforcement by Coast Guard vessels was in connection with other enforcement duties.

Funding problems
Since the Coast Guard was tasked with prohibiting the importation of liquor through U.S. waters and it didn't have the resources to do so, Commandant Reynolds submitted a plan to Treasury Secretary Andrew Mellon that called for 20 new cutters, 200 coastal patrol cutters and 90 fast picket boats. He also asked for 20 million dollars to fund new construction and an additional 3,500 personnel to man the new vessels.

Congress acts
To deal with this problem, twenty-five destroyers were transferred by the United States Navy to the Treasury Department for service with the Coast Guard. Some began to show signs of wear and tear after the often arduous pace of operations on the Rum Patrol and required replacement. Accordingly, six of the newer flush deck destroyers were transferred to the Treasury Department in 1930–1932.

It was thought that adapting these older vessels for Coast Guard service would be less costly than building new ships. In the end, however, the rehabilitation of the vessels was costly because of the exceedingly poor condition of many of these war-weary ships. In many instances, it took nearly a year to bring the vessels up to seaworthiness. Additionally, these were by far the largest and most sophisticated vessels ever operated by the service, and trained personnel were nearly nonexistent. As a result, Congress authorized hundreds of new enlistees. These inexperienced men generally made up the destroyer crews.

Some of the destroyers were pre-World War I 742-ton "flivvers", capable of over  –  an advantage in the rum-chasing business. They were, however, easily outmaneuvered by smaller vessels. The destroyers’ mission, therefore, was to picket the larger mother ships and prevent them from off-loading their cargo onto the smaller, speedier contact boats that ran the liquor into shore.

On 20 February 1933, the 21st Amendment to the Constitution, the repeal of Amendment 18, was proposed by Congress and ratification was completed on 5 December 1933. This eliminated prohibition, and therefore the need for the Rum Patrol. The remaining destroyers were returned to the Navy and sold for scrap.

Ships of the Patrol

References

Citations

Sources

 
 
 

 

History of the United States Coast Guard
Rum
Prohibition in the United States